Law school rankings are a specific subset of college and university rankings  dealing specifically with law schools.  Like college and university rankings, law school rankings can be based on empirical data, subjectively-perceived qualitative data (often survey research of educators, law professors, lawyers, students, or others), or some combination of these. Such rankings are often consulted by prospective students as they choose which schools they will apply to or which school they will attend. There are several different law school rankings, each of which has a different emphasis and methodology.

U.S. News & World Report rankings
U.S. News & World Report (USNWR) is considered to be the most influential ranking among law schools. USNWR organizes rankings into two main sections: the first is a "Top 145" listing the top 145 schools in order from highest to lowest ranked. U.S. News groups the remaining schools, or the bottom 25 percent of those that are ranked, into a "Rank Not Published" group. Schools that fall into this category are listed alphabetically and not by actual ranking. U.S. News also ranks each school's specialty programs using a similar method, if applicable. U.S. News ranked 196 schools in 2016. Each school's U.S. News ranking tends to fluctuate annually.

Consistency at the top of the U.S. News Rankings
U.S. News published its first attempt at ranking U.S. law schools in 1987, and it has released annual rankings beginning in 1990. There has been great consistency at the top of the U.S. News rankings since their inception, with Yale Law School consistently ranking first. While Yale, University of Chicago, Harvard, and Stanford have historically clustered at the top of the list, Harvard was recently replaced by the University of Chicago in the third place spot.

Top 14 law schools
There exists an informal category known as the "Top Fourteen" or "T14", which has historically referred to the fourteen institutions that regularly claim the top spots in the yearly U.S. News & World Report ranking of American law schools. Furthermore, the "T14" schools remain the only ones to have ever placed within the top ten spots in these rankings.  Although "T14" is not a designation used by U.S. News itself, the term is "widely known in the legal community." While these schools have seen their position within the top fourteen spots shift frequently, they have generally not placed outside of the top fourteen since the inception of the rankings. There have been rare exceptions: Texas and UCLA appeared in the 1987 list, before the start of the annual rankings (ahead of Northwestern and Cornell); Texas and UCLA displaced Georgetown in 2018 and 2022, respectively. Because of their relatively consistent placement at the top of these rankings, the schools that have taken the annual top spots since 1990 are commonly referred to as the "Top Fourteen" by published books on law school admissions, undergraduate university pre-law advisers, professional law school consultants, and newspaper articles on the subject.

The 14 schools that most consistently appear at the top of the U.S. News & World Report ranking of American law schools, commonly known as the "Top 14" or "T14" are, in alphabetical order:

 Columbia Law School
 Cornell Law School
 Duke University School of Law
 Georgetown University Law Center
 Harvard Law School
 New York University School of Law
 Northwestern University School of Law
 Stanford Law School
 University of California, Berkeley School of Law
 University of Chicago Law School
 University of Michigan Law School
 University of Pennsylvania Law School
 University of Virginia School of Law
 Yale Law School

ARWU (Academic Ranking of World Universities) 

In 2017, ARWU released its rankings of world universities in the subject of law by taking into account only the academic strength of the institution. In 2021, ARWU ranked all T-14 US Law Schools within the world's top 20 law schools.

==National Law Journal'''s Go-To Law School Rankings==

Several ranking systems are explicitly designed to focus on employment outcomes at or shortly after graduation, including rankings by the National Law Journal and Law.com.

The National Law Journal ranks the top 50 law schools by the percentage of juris doctor graduates who took jobs at NLJ 250 firms, the nation's largest by headcount as identified by The National Law Journal’s annual survey. It provides an alternative comparison of its own employment-based rankings to the U.S. News rankings.

 QS World University Rankings 
The 2020 QS World University Rankings for Law ranked 14 U.S. institutions in the top 50 worldwide. The U.S. institutions in the top 10 were Harvard Law School, which ranked first, with Yale Law School ranked fourth, Stanford Law School ranked fifth, NYU School of Law ranked sixth, UC Berkeley School of Law ranked seventh, and Columbia Law School ranked tenth. Every other law school in U.S. News & World Reports T14 rankings except University of Virginia School of Law made the QS Top 50. The UCLA School of Law was the only other U.S. school ranked in the top 50.

Social Science Research Network
Social Science Research Network—a repository for draft and completed scholarship in law and the social sciences—publishes monthly rankings of law schools  based on the number of times faculty members' scholarship was downloaded.  Rankings are available by total number of downloads, total number of downloads within the last 12 months, and downloads per faculty member to adjust for the size of different institutions.  SSRN also provides rankings of individual law school faculty members on these metrics.

Criticisms of rankings
Among the criticisms of law school rankings is that they are arbitrary in the characteristics they measure and the value given to each one. Another complaint is that a prospective law student should take into account the "fit" and appropriateness of each school, and that there is not a "one size fits all" ranking.  Others complain that common rankings shortchange schools due to geographical or demographic reasons. One critic has gone so far as to create a website that sarcastically ranks US magazines. U.S. News is placed alone in the "Third Tier."

The American Bar Association, which has consistently refused to support or participate in law school rankings, has issued disclaimers on law school rating systems, and encourages prospective law students to consider a variety of factors in making their choice among schools. Further, the Association of American Law Schools has also voiced criticisms of U.S. News's ranking system. Carl Monk, its former executive director, once went so far as to say "these rankings are a misleading and deceptive, profit-generating commercial enterprise that compromises U.S. News & World Report's journalistic integrity."

As a response to the prevalence of law school rankings, the ABA and the LSAC publish an annual law school guide.  This guide, which does not seek to rank or sort law schools by any criteria, instead seeks to provide the reader with a set of standard, important data on which to judge law schools.  It contains information on all 200 ABA-Approved Law Schools.  This reference, called The Official Guide to ABA-Approved Law Schools is provided free online and also in print for a small cost.  A similar guide for Canadian Law Schools is also published by the Law School Admission Council and is called Official Guide to Canadian Law Schools.  These guides seek to serve as an alternative to the U.S. News Rankings and law school rankings in general.

Additionally, the American Bar Association issued the MacCrate Report in 1992, which outlined many fundamental problems with modern legal education and called for reform in American law schools.  While the report was hailed as a "template for modern legal education", its practice-oriented tenets have met resistance by law schools continually ranked in the "top 13."

Ranking systems, most prominently that of U.S. News, has not allowed these criticisms to go unanswered.  They regularly outline and justify their methodology alongside the rankings, and have even published defenses of their value. Additionally, law professors William Henderson and Andrew Morriss have come out with a study criticizing law schools' (and the ABA's) refusal to adopt any better objective comparison method for the continued widespread reliance on U.S. News. Henderson and Morriss allege that law schools' attempts to "game" their U.S. News ranking by manipulating postgraduation employment statistics or applicant selectivity have led U.S. News to adjust its methodology accordingly, resulting in a counter-productive cycle. They go on to suggest that the ABA should use its accreditation power to mandate greater transparency in law schools' statistical reporting.

In March 2011, Loyola Law School Dean Victor Gold penned an op-ed in the Huffington Post, accusing U.S. News & World Report of "refus[ing] to consider diversity as a factor in its ranking system."  Gold asserted that "[t]here is a broad consensus among law school deans and professors that diversity enriches law school education."  Loyola, which has a large Asian student body, claims 37% of its students are "minorities," but it does not provide any specifics.

In November 2022, 11 of the 14 "T14" law Schools announced that they would no longer participate in the U.S. News rankings by declining to submit admissions data. One of their criticism was that the rankings don’t give enough credit to programs that train lawyers interested in public service. In response, U.S. News pledged to modify its law school rankings to capture the individual nuances of each school. Additionally, the magazine said that it will continue ranking all fully accredited law schools, regardless of whether schools agree to submit their data.

Impact of rankings
Despite these criticisms, law school rankings in general and those by U.S. News in particular play a role in the world of legal education. This pressure has also resulted in various schools "gaming the rankings."  In a March 2003 article in Student Lawyer'', Jane Easter Bahls stated that, in order to appear more selective, some law schools reject applicants whose high LSAT scores indicate that they probably would go somewhere else. Other schools, in an attempt to increase the amount of money spent per student, increase tuition and return it to the students as financial aid.

References

 
University and college rankings in the United States